The Rugby League Varsity Match is an annual rugby league match between Cambridge University and Oxford University. The first Varsity match took place on Sunday 26 April 1981 at Craven Cottage.

Past winners

See also
 Student Rugby League
 University Sporting Blue
 The Varsity Match

References

External links
 Official Rugby League Varsity Match website
 Cambridge University RLFC website
 Oxford University RLFC website

Recurring sporting events established in 1981
Rugby league in England
Sport at the University of Oxford
Sport at the University of Cambridge
University and college rugby league
Oxbridge sporting rivalries
March sporting events
Rugby league matches